Casey Dellacqua and Adriana Szili were the defending champions, but did not compete in the Juniors that year. 

Chan Yung-jan and Sun Shengnan won the title, defeating Veronika Chvojková and Nicole Vaidišová in the final, 7–5, 6–3.

Seeds

Draw

Finals

Top half

Bottom half

References

Girls' Doubles
Australian Open, 2004 Girls' Doubles